Amphidromus baoi is a species of medium-sized air-breathing tree snail, an arboreal gastropod mollusk in the family Camaenidae.

Habitat 
This species lives in trees.

Distribution 
The type locality of this species is Đắk Lắk Province, Vietnam.

Etymology 
This species is named after Phạm Quốc Bảo for encouraging him in malacological study .

References 

baoi
Gastropods described in 2017